Zangebar or Zangabar or Zangbar may refer to:
 Zangebar, Ardabil
 Zangbar, East Azerbaijan
 Zangebar Rural District, in West Azerbaijan Province